is a Japanese international rugby union player who plays in the lock position.

Early / Provincial Career

Usami has played all of his senior club rugby in Japan with the Canon Eagles who he joined in 2014.

Super Rugby Career

Usami was selected as a member of the first ever Sunwolves squad ahead of the 2016 Super Rugby season, however he did not make any appearances.

International

Usami made his senior international debut for Japan in a match against South Korea on April 18, 2015.   He has largely featured in matches against other Asian nations such as Korea and Hong Kong, but he did play as a starter against  in Vancouver during the 2016 mid-year rugby union internationals series.

Super Rugby Statistics

References

External links
 

1992 births
Living people
Japanese rugby union players
Japan international rugby union players
Rugby union locks
Yokohama Canon Eagles players
Sunwolves players
Sportspeople from Ehime Prefecture
Ritsumeikan University alumni